Team Waoo was a Danish UCI Continental team founded in 2012, and disbanded in 2019. In July 2016 Bjarne Riis and former Saxo Bank CEO Lars Seier announced that they had taken the team over and renamed it Team Virtu Pro-Veloconcept, with the intention of it functioning as the development team for a planned UCI WorldTeam. On 11 September 2017 the team changed its name into Team Virtu Cycling, after a new owner, Jan Bech Andersen, had bought one third of the shares.
In July 2018, the name changed again to Team Waoo.

Team roster

Major wins

2013
Course de la Paix U23, Asbjørn Kragh Andersen
2014
Stages 4 & 5 Tour du Loir-et-Cher, Rasmus Guldhammer
Hadeland GP, Rasmus Guldhammer
 National U23 Time Trial Championships, Søren Kragh Andersen
 National Time Trial Championships, Rasmus Quaade
2015
Stage 5 Tour du Loir-et-Cher, Asbjørn Kragh Andersen
Hadeland GP, Søren Kragh Andersen
Ringerike GP, Asbjørn Kragh Andersen
Stage 5 Flèche du Sud, Asbjørn Kragh Andersen
Stage 3 Paris–Arras Tour, Asbjørn Kragh Andersen
Stage 4 Tour des Fjords, Søren Kragh Andersen
 National U23 Time Trial Championships, Jonas Gregaard
Prologue & Stage 3 Tour de l'Avenir, Søren Kragh Andersen
2016
Overall Le Triptyque des Monts et Châteaux, Mads Würtz Schmidt
Stages 2 & 3b, Mads Würtz Schmidt
2017
Stage 3 International Tour of Rhodes, Alexander Kamp
Stage 2 Circuit des Ardennes, Rasmus Guldhammer
Overall Tour du Loir-et-Cher, Alexander Kamp
Stage 4, Alexander Kamp
GP Viborg, Kasper Asgreen
Sundvolden GP, Rasmus Guldhammer
Ringerike GP, Rasmus Guldhammer
2018
Stage 1 Istrian Spring Trophy, Kasper Asgreen
Overall Tour du Loir-et-Cher, Asbjørn Kragh Andersen
Eschborn–Frankfurt Under-23, Niklas Larsen
Stage 1 Rhône-Alpes Isère Tour, Alexander Kamp
Sundvolden GP, Alexander Kamp
Stage 5 Tour of Norway, Alexander Kamp
Circuit de Wallonie, Mikkel Frølich Honoré
Lillehammer GP, Alexander Kamp
2019
Stage 7 Tour de Normandie, Johan Langballe

National champions
2014
 Denmark Time Trial, Rasmus Quaade
 Denmark U23 Time Trial, Søren Kragh Andersen

2015
 Denmark U23 Time Trial, Jonas Gregaard

2016
 Denmark U23 Time Trial, Mads Würtz Schmidt
 Denmark U23 Road Race, Mads Würtz Schmidt
 Denmark Track (Kilo), Niklas Larsen
 Denmark Track (Individual pursuit), Niklas Larsen
 Denmark Track (Scratch race), Niklas Larsen

Notes

References

UCI Continental Teams (Europe)
Cycling teams based in Denmark
Defunct cycling teams based in Denmark
Cycling teams established in 2012
Cycling teams disestablished in 2019